Seedamm-Center is a subsidiary of the Swiss Vögele Group which runs the shopping mall in the locality Pfäffikon of the municipality of Freienbach in the Canton of Schwyz.

History 
Seedamm-Center is counted among the most popular shopping destinations in the greater Zürich metropolitan area. At the time of its construction in 1974, it claimed to be one of the biggest mall properties in Switzerland. In 1985 a second building complex was added, and in 2005 the mall was rebuilt to fit present standards.

To realize these plans, the westerly Migrol area should be used, as of September 2015 still separated by a road and a meadow, to enable further shops. Among others, an OBI garden center, a new Migros store and a Migros restaurant shall be realized to 2016, as well as additional 400 underground parking facilities to amount to a total of 1,800. The new building will be connected to the existing building complex, totalling in costs of about 100 million Swiss Francs for construction and infrastructure. A Federal Court judgment of 2005 demands among others establish the new facilities emission-neutral, but in 2012 the management also claimed to plan an office building and a petrol station with a shop and a new direct connection to the A3 national highway by a road bridge, built and financed by the shared owners, the Seedamm Immobilien AG and Migros-Genossenschaft Zürich. The necessary adjustments for the access to the highway had to be financed by the federal government. As of September 2014, four appeals have been filed at the federal court related to the modifications to the motorway exit Pfäffikon.

To the west of the shopping complex, the headquarter of the Charles Vögele group is situated, and to the north there's the complex of the Alpamare waterpark. The mall is named after the Seedamm area on the Zürichsee lake shore between Hurden and Rapperswil. The former Seedamm Kulturzentrum (now Vögele Kultur Zentrum) was built as a separate section of the building complex.

Vögele Kultur Zentrum 
The Seedamm Kulturzentrum was renamed to Vögele Kultur Zentrum. The cultural center claims to provide multidisciplinary exhibitions for an audience of wide interests. So different aspects of a socially relevant subject may be discussed on the basis of art, scenic installations, everyday objects and media contributions in the exhibitions, to sensitize the visitors in an entertaining way, encouraging them to reflect as well as to discuss. Interdisciplinary projects, events, a cultural bulletin and versatile placement deals accompany all exhibitions.

The former Seedamm Kulturzentrum is listed in the Swiss inventory of cultural property of national and regional significance as a Class A object of national importance.

References

External links 

  

Shopping malls in Switzerland
Shopping malls established in 1974
Freienbach
Buildings and structures in the canton of Schwyz
Cultural property of national significance in the canton of Schwyz
Swiss companies established in 1974
20th-century architecture in Switzerland